Janek Roos (born 6 November 1974) is a retired Danish badminton player from Kastrup-Magleby club. A former Handball player, Roos also excelled in his badminton career.

Achievements

European Junior Championships 
Boys' doubles

IBF World Grand Prix 
The World Badminton Grand Prix sanctioned by International Badminton Federation (IBF) since 1983.

Men's doubles

Mixed doubles

IBF International 
Men's singles

Men's doubles

Mixed doubles

References 

1974 births
Living people
Danish male badminton players